The Solent Group is a geological group in the Hampshire Basin of southern England. It preserves fossils ranging in age from Priabonian (uppermost Eocene) to Rupelian (lower Oligocene). The group is subdivided into three formations, the Headon Hill Formation, the Bembridge Limestone Formation and the Bouldnor Formation.

See also

 List of fossiliferous stratigraphic units in England

References
 

Paleogene England